Franco Enrique Navarro Mandayo (born 24 October 1990) is a Peruvian footballer who plays as a striker for Alianza Lima in the Torneo Descentralizado. He was born in Santa Fe, Argentina and is the son of Franco Navarro.

Club career
Franco Navarro Manadayo started playing with Academia Tito Drago in 2003. Between 2005 and 2007 he was part of Universidad San Martín de Porres's youth teams. He then joined Cienciano's youth squad. He made his debut in the Torneo Descentralizado with Cienciano in 2008.

He transferred to Sporting Cristal for the 2009 season but was released soon after.

References

External links 

1990 births
Living people
Footballers from Santa Fe, Argentina
Peruvian footballers
Cienciano footballers
Sporting Cristal footballers
Total Chalaco footballers
Club Atlético Independiente footballers
Club Alianza Lima footballers
Peruvian Primera División players
Expatriate footballers in Argentina
Association football forwards